The Bulgarian GHR A is the name of the handball league of Bulgaria.

Competition Format 

The season begins with a regular season between the ten teams, then the first four teams qualifies for semifinals.

2018/19 Season participants

The following 10 clubs compete in the GHR A during the 2016–17 season.

GHR A past champions 

 1961 : VIF Dimitrov Sofia
 1962 : VIF Dimitrov Sofia (2)
 1963 : Akademik Sofia
 1964 : VIF Dimitrov Sofia (3)
 1965 : VIF Dimitrov Sofia (4)
 1966 : SC Sportist Kremikovtzki Sofia
 1967 : VIF Dimitrov Sofia (5)
 1968 : SC Sportist Kremikovtzki Sofia (2)
 1969 : Levski-Spartak Sofia
 1970 : VIF Dimitrov Sofia (6)
 1971 : Chernomorets Burgas
 1972 : Lokomotiv Sofia
 1973 : Lokomotiv Sofia (2)
 1974 : Lokomotiv Sofia (3)
 1975 : SC Sportist Kremikovtzki Sofia (3)
 1976 : CSKA Sofia
 1977 : Lokomotiv Sofia (4)
 1978 : CSKA Sofia (2)
 1979 : CSKA Sofia (3)
 1980 : VIF Dimitrov Sofia (7)
 1981 : CSKA Sofia (4)
 1982 : VIF Dimitrov Sofia (8)
 1983 : CSKA Sofia (5)
 1984 : CSKA Sofia (6)
 1985 : SC Sportist Kremikovtzki Sofia (4)
 1986 : VIF Dimitrov Sofia (9)
 1987 : CSKA Sofia (7)
 1988 : VIF Dimitrov Sofia (10)
 1989 : CSKA Sofia (8)
 1990 : CSKA Sofia (9)
 1991 : CSKA Sofia (10)
 1992 : Belasitza Petrich
 1993 : Belasitza Petrich (2)
 1994 : Belasitza Petrich (3)
 1995 : HC Lyulin Sofia
 1996 : Shumen
 1997 : HC Port Burgas
 1998 : HC Port Burgas (2)
 1999 : HC Port Burgas (3)
 2000 : HC Lokomotiv Varna
 2001 : HC Lokomotiv Varna (2)
 2002 : HC Lokomotiv Varna (3)
 2003 : HC Lokomotiv Varna (4)
 2004 : HC Spartak Varna
 2005 : HC Lokomotiv Varna (5)
 2006 : HC Lokomotiv Varna (6)
 2007 : HC Lokomotiv Varna (7)
 2008 : HC Lokomotiv Varna (8)
 2009 : SKH DIU Shumen (2)
 2010 : SKH DIU Shumen (3)
 2011 : SKH DIU Shumen (4)
 2012 : HC Dobrudja
 2013 : HC Dobrudja (2) 
 2014 : HC Fregata-Burgas
 2015 : HC Fregata-Burgas (2)
 2016 : HC Fregata-Burgas (3)
 2017 : HC Lokomotiv Varna (9)
 2018 : HC Lokomotiv Varna (10)
 2019 : HC Lokomotiv Varna (11)
 2020 : HC Lokomotiv Varna (12)
 2021 : SKH DIU Shumen (5)

EHF coefficient ranking
For season 2017/2018, see footnote

32.  (28)  Premijer liga BiH (5.56)
33.  (31)  Serie A (3.50)
33.  (35)  GHR A (3.50)
35.  (33)  A1 Andrón (3.00)
36.  (38)  Divizia Națională (2.00)

External links
 Official website

References

GHR A
Bulgaria
Sports leagues established in 1961
1961 establishments in Bulgaria
Professional sports leagues in Bulgaria